Golconda High School is a 2011 Indian Telugu-language sports drama film directed by Mohan Krishna Indraganti under the Artbeat Capital banner. It stars Sumanth and Swati Reddy. The film has cinematography, K. K. Senthil Kumar while the music was scored by Kalyani Malik. It is based on the book The Men Within, written by Hari Mohan Paruvu. The film was released on 15 January 2011.

Plot
Golconda High School's Board of Trustees' member Kireet Das comes up with a proposal to convert its cricket playground into an IIT coaching center. Principal Viswanath opposes that proposal vehemently, but he's in the minority. Kireet challenges him to show positive results in at least one sport to justify retaining the playground. They come to an agreement that the ground  will remain with the school if its cricket team wins the State level cricket tournament. To coach them, Vishwanath summons Sampath, his former student with a seemingly chequered past.

Led by Siddanth, and due to their lack of discipline, the team resists Sampath's training. Siddanth then arrogantly challenges Sampath to a students vs. teachers cricket game, the deal being that if the students win, they won't follow his coaching anymore. Towards the end of the game, the frustrated Siddanth deserts his losing team. Gowtham subsequently takes over captaincy and the students manage to tie the game, only because Sampath purposely gets bowled out in the last over. The students get impressed with Sampath's cricketing prowess and decide to follow him, despite Siddanth's opposition.

Later when Sampath helps remove a police case against their team member, Mikey, they realize his compassionate nature and embrace his coaching wholeheartedly. Siddanth too eventually follows suit. The GHS team, after coming to know of the deal between Kireet and Viswanath over the cricket ground, get further motivated and raise their efforts towards winning every match. The team advances to the finals, where they face the strong Everglades team. Just before the finals, the GHS boys come to know that the Everglades coach Sundar and Sampath share some bad blood from the past.  When Sampath refuses to reveal his personal history with Sundar, the team starts doubting him and lose focus, letting their opponents amass a big total.  During the break, Viswanath, coming to know of the misunderstanding between coach and team, tells the boys  exactly what had happened between Sampath and Sundar 15 years ago. He tells them that, Sundar, also an ex GHS student, purposely got Sampath run out during the final championship match, where the latter had played brilliantly. To attain personal glory, Sundar went on to black list Sampath, depriving him of any future in cricket.

The team, upon realising the truth, apologise to Sampath for doubting him. Sampath motivates them with a stirring speech subsequently. GHS comes onto field with 10 batsmen as Siddanth suffers an injury during fielding. They virtually chase down the big score and the match is tantalizingly poised in the last over. Siddhanth, to the surprise of everyone, comes back from injury and wins the game for GHS off the last ball.

Golconda High School wins the championship for the first time in 15 years, and the cricket ground is saved.

Cast
 Sumanth as Sampath
 Swati Reddy as Anjali
 Subbaraju as Kiriti Das
 Tanikella Bharani as Viswanath
 Shafi as Madhu Babu
 Harsha Vardhan
 Sivannarayana Naripeddi
 Jhansi
 Vidya Sagar Rachakonda as Umpire

Cricket team

 Santosh Sobhan as Gowtham
 Sreenivasa Sayee as Siddanth
 Suraj Gontla as Vikas
 Farookh as Michel
 Sangeet Sobhan as Varun
 Vasudev Sastry as Ramesh
 Sai Kiran as Ashish
 Sai Pradeep as Shameem
 Lalith as Rajeender
 Sri Raj as Nissar
 Nikhil Saketh as Karthik
 Rohith as Noel
 Sudhir Kumar as Sanjay
 Bharath Raj as Khaleel

Home Media
The film Satellite rights was bagged by Zee Telugu

Soundtrack
Kalyani Malik has composed the original score and soundtracks for the film.

References

2011 films
2010s Telugu-language films
Indian sports drama films
Films about cricket in India
Films based on Indian novels
2010s sports drama films
Films directed by Mohan Krishna Indraganti
2011 drama films